Rich O'Toole is an American country singer-songwriter from Houston, Texas, United States.

In early 2006, O'Toole released his debut album, Seventeen. Americana Music Times, then called Texas Music Times, named Seventeen the "Best Album of 2006 That No One Told You About."

O'Toole released his second album, the Mack Damon produced In a Minute or 2, on October 21, 2008. O'Toole's third album, Kiss of a Liar featured the duet with Josh Abbott titled "Ay Dios Mio" and a cover of Wilco's "Casino Queen" with guest performer Pat Green.

O'Toole co-produced his fourth album, Brightwork, with Damon and Ilya Toshinsky and released it on his personal record label, PTO Records.  His latest album, Jaded, also on PTO, was released in June 2014.

O’Toole released his 6th studio album "American Kid” on March 17, 2017. Which reached to 43 on the Billboard Country Charts and No. 5 on the Country iTunes Chart.

In 2020 O’Toole signed a record deal with Average Joe's Entertainment giving him his own record imprint Buffalo Roam Records which released his 7th studio album “New York” which reached the top ten on the iTunes & billboard country music charts.

With over 20 Million streams on Spotify & Apple Music O’Toole has become a household name in the Texas Music scene. O’Toole is also a member of Mensa has launched several different successful iPhone Apps. “TexMoji” which sold over 65,000 units its first week and was featured in Time & People Magazine.

O’Toole is currently writing his 8th studio album which will be released in 2022.

Discography

Studio albums

Music videos

References

External links

American country singer-songwriters
American male singer-songwriters
Living people
1983 births
Average Joes Entertainment artists
Musicians from Houston
Singer-songwriters from Texas
21st-century American singers
Country musicians from Texas
21st-century American male singers